Mauro Emiliano Cejas (born 24 August 1985, in Adrogué), commonly known as Pitu is an Argentine footballer who most recently played as a midfielder or second striker. He plays for Unión de Santa Fe. He also holds Mexican citizenship.

Career
On 8 December 2014, Monarcas Morelia announced that they had reached an agreement with Club Santos Laguna for the loan of 'El Pitu' in a season-long loan deal. On 25 November 2015, Morelia announced via Twitter that Cejas' loan had ended, that same day, Cejas appeared on Santos Laguna transferred players for the next season.

Honours
Santos Laguna
Copa MX: Apertura 2014

References

External links
 
 Statistics at Guardian StatsCentre
 Argentine Primera statistics at Fútbol XXI 

1985 births
Living people
People from Adrogué
Argentine emigrants to Mexico
Naturalized citizens of Mexico
Association football midfielders
Argentine footballers
Mexican footballers
Club Atlético Temperley footballers
Newell's Old Boys footballers
Tecos F.C. footballers
C.F. Monterrey players
C.F. Pachuca players
Santos Laguna footballers
Atlético Morelia players
Club Puebla players
Unión de Santa Fe footballers
Argentine Primera División players
Liga MX players
Argentine expatriate footballers
Sportspeople from Buenos Aires Province